Charles Henry Gordon-Lennox, 7th Duke of Richmond and Lennox, 2nd Duke of Gordon,  (27 December 1845 – 18 January 1928), 7th Duke of Aubigny (French peerage in the French nobility), styled Lord Settrington until 1860 and Earl of March between 1860 and 1903, was a British politician and peer.

Early life
Styled Lord Settrington from birth, he was born at Portland Place, London on 27 December 1845. He was the eldest son of Charles Henry Gordon-Lennox, 6th Duke of Richmond and Frances Harriett Greville (1824–1887). His elder sister, Lady Caroline Gordon-Lennox, who never married, acted as chatelaine of Goodwood after their mother's death in 1887. His younger siblings were Lord Algernon Gordon-Lennox (who married Blanche Maynard and was the father of Ivy Cavendish-Bentinck, Duchess of Portland), Capt. Lord Francis Gordon-Lennox (who died unmarried), Lady Florence Gordon-Lennox (who died unmarried), and Lord Walter Gordon-Lennox (who married Alice Ogilvie-Grant).

His paternal grandparents were Charles Gordon-Lennox, 5th Duke of Richmond and Lady Caroline Paget (eldest daughter of Henry Paget, 1st Marquess of Anglesey and Lady Caroline Elizabeth Villiers, a daughter of George Villiers, 4th Earl of Jersey). His maternal grandparents were Algernon Greville (second son of Capt. Charles Greville and Lady Charlotte Cavendish-Bentinck, eldest daughter of William Cavendish-Bentinck, 3rd Duke of Portland) and the former Charlotte Cox (a daughter of Richard Henry Cox, of Hillingdon).

In his youth, he visited America on a hunting trip to the Rocky Mountains, spending the winter in a log hut. He was educated at Eton between 1859 and 1863. In 1860 he became known as the Earl of March after his father succeeded to the dukedom.

Career

Lord March joined the Grenadier Guards two years later, although he retired in 1869 after he was elected Member of Parliament for West Sussex. He represented that constituency until it was abolished for the 1885 general election, when he was returned to the House of Commons for the Chichester constituency. He held his seat until 1889. Around this time, he was appointed as an Ecclesiastical Commissioner, a position he occupied until 1903.

He served in the part-time Royal Sussex Light Infantry Militia, being promoted to Lieutenant-Colonel in command of its 2nd Battalion on 28 June 1876. The regiment became the 3rd (Militia) Battalion of the Royal Sussex Regiment in 1881, and March was appointed its Lt-Col Commandant on 9 July 1887. March and his brother, Lord Algernon Gordon-Lennox, both served in the Second Boer War, with March commanding his battalion in South Africa from its arrival in March 1901 until its return to England in June 1902 following the Peace of Vereeniging. For his service in the war, he was appointed a Companion of the Order of the Bath (CB) in the October 1902 South African Honours list.

Lord March was appointed Lord Lieutenant of Elginshire on 27 August 1902, and also served as Lord Lieutenant of Banffshire from November 1903, after his father's death.

On 27 September 1903, Gordon-Lennox succeeded his father as 7th Duke of Richmond and Lennox and 2nd Duke of Gordon (2nd creation) as well as the dukedom of Aubigny, which had been conferred on his ancestor Louise de Kérouaille, Duchess of Portsmouth, by French King Louis XIV. In 1904, King Edward VII made him a Knight Grand Cross of the Royal Victorian Order (GCVO) and a Knight of the Order of the Garter (KG). He was Grand Master of the Sussex branch of the Freemasons from 1902. After his retirement from the militia, he was appointed Honorary Colonel of his battalion on 27 May 1906.

Personal life

Lord Richmond was twice married. His first marriage was on 10 November 1868 to Amy Mary Ricardo (1847–1879), daughter of Percy Ricardo of Bramley Park at Guildford in Surrey, and the former Matilda Mawdesley Hensley (a daughter of John Isaac Hensley of Holborn in Middlesex). She was the sister of Colonel Horace Ricardo and of Colonel Francis Ricardo of Cookham in Berkshire. Before her death on 23 August 1879, aged 32, they had three sons and two daughters:

 Charles Henry Gordon-Lennox, 8th Duke of Richmond (1870–1935), who married Hilda Madeline Brassey, eldest surviving daughter of Henry Arthur Brassey, MP, of Preston Hall, in 1893.
 Lady Evelyn Amy Gordon-Lennox (1872–1922), who married Sir John Cotterell, 4th Baronet, in 1896.
 Lady Violet Mary Gordon-Lennox (1874–1946), who married Henry Brassey, 1st Baron Brassey, of Apethorpe, in 1894.
 Lord Esmé Charles Gordon-Lennox (1875–1949), a Brigadier-General in the British Army who was Yeoman Usher of the Black Rod and Secretary to the Lord Great Chamberlain; he married Hon. Hermione Frances Caroline Fellowes, third daughter of William Fellowes, 2nd Baron de Ramsey, in 1909. They divorced in 1923 and he married Rosamond Lorys Palmer, daughter of Vice Admiral Norman Craig Palmer, in 1923.
 Lord Bernard Charles Gordon-Lennox (1878–1914), a Major in the British Army who married Hon. Evelyn Loch, second daughter of Henry Loch, 1st Baron Loch, in 1907.

On 3 July 1882, he married Isabel Sophie Craven, second daughter of William George Craven (a grandson of William Craven, 1st Earl of Craven) and Lady Mary Yorke (second daughter of Charles Yorke, 4th Earl of Hardwicke). They had two daughters:

 Lady Muriel Beatrice Gordon-Lennox (1884–1969), who married Maj. William Malebisse Beckwith, only son of Capt. Henry John Beckwith, of Millichope Park, in 1904. They divorced in 1933 and she married Cmdr. Lewis Derek Jones, of Newton House, eldest son of Maj.-Gen. Lewis Jones, of Stoke Lodge, Stoke Poges, in 1933.
 Lady Helen Magdalen Gordon-Lennox (1886–1865), Mistress of the Robes to Queen Elizabeth The Queen Mother; she married Alan Percy, 8th Duke of Northumberland, in 1911.

Lady Richmond died in November 1887, aged 24. Lord Richmond remained a widower until his death in London on 18 January 1928, aged 82. He was buried in Chichester Cathedral and was succeeded in the dukedom by his eldest son, Charles.

Estate
The duke died with assets excluding family-entrusted land such as at Goodwood House where he lived (and as his forebears was a parochial and district patron). These were probated at £310,380. His interests in the family-entrusted lands were proved at £1731 in 1929. In 1930, the 8th Duke was forced to sell "a considerable number of pictures and books from Goodwood House and Gordon Castle, his Scottish seat near Fochabers" due to the "heavy succession duteis and increasing taxation".

Ancestry

References

External links
 
Charles Gordon-Lennox, 7th Duke of Richmond

1845 births
1928 deaths
Companions of the Order of the Bath
207
307
202
Charles
Garter Knights appointed by Edward VII
March, Charles Gordon-Lennox, Earl of
Grenadier Guards officers
Knights Grand Cross of the Royal Victorian Order
March, Charles Gordon-Lennox, Earl of
March, Charles Gordon-Lennox, Earl of
March, Charles Gordon-Lennox, Earl of
March, Charles Gordon-Lennox, Earl of
March, Charles Gordon-Lennox, Earl of
Richmond, D7
March, Charles Gordon-Lennox, Earl of
March, Charles Gordon-Lennox, Earl of
Sussex Militia officers
Royal Sussex Regiment officers
British Army personnel of the Second Boer War
Burials at Chichester Cathedral
Freemasons of the United Grand Lodge of England
People educated at Eton College
Dukes of Aubigny